Edith is an female given name.

Edith may also refer to:

Places
 Edith, Texas, USA; a ghost town
 Edith Creek, Tasmania, Australia
 Edith River, Edith Saddle, Fiordland, New Zealand; a river
 Edith Falls, Edith River, Nitmiluk National Park, Northern Territory, Australia; a waterfall
 Edith Formation, New Mexico, USA; a Pleistocene geologic formation
 Mount Edith, Sawback Range, Bow River Valley, Banff National Park, Alberta, Canada; a mountain
 517 Edith, the asteroid Edith, a main-belt asteroid, 517th asteroid registered

Other uses
 Saint Edith (disambiguation)
 , a U.S. Navy shipname
 , a paddle steamship
 Tropical Storm Edith, several cyclonic storms
 Edith (TV series), former name of the British TV show Hold the Sunset

See also

 Robert fitzEdith (1093–1172), illegitimate son of Henry I of England
 Aunt Edith (1962–1986), British racehorse
 Edith Weston, Rutland, East Midlands, England, UK
 Stoke Edith, Herefordshire, England, UK
 
 Eadgyth (disambiguation)
 Eadgifu (disambiguation)
 Ealdgyth (disambiguation)